Neff Round Barn, also known as the Red Round Barn, is a historic round barn located at Potter Township, Centre County, Pennsylvania. It was built about 1910, and is a white pine structure on a limestone foundation. The interior has two floors: the cattle floor and the mow floor. It has a conical roof.

It was added to the National Register of Historic Places in 1979.

References

External links

Historic American Buildings Survey in Pennsylvania
Round barns in Pennsylvania
Barns on the National Register of Historic Places in Pennsylvania
Infrastructure completed in 1910
Buildings and structures in Centre County, Pennsylvania
National Register of Historic Places in Centre County, Pennsylvania